The Academy of the Holy Cross is a Catholic college preparatory school sponsored by the Sisters of the Holy Cross and founded in 1868. The academy is located on a  campus in North Bethesda, Maryland (Kensington postal address), north of Washington, D.C.

Notable alumnae 

 Helen Hayes
 Hilary Rhoda, model
 Rhamat Alhassan, volleyball player for Florida and winner of the Honda Sports Award for volleyball

References

External links 

Holy Cross secondary schools
Educational institutions established in 1868
Catholic secondary schools in Maryland
Girls' schools in Maryland
Schools in Montgomery County, Maryland
1868 establishments in Maryland
Kensington, Maryland